Roberto Silva Martínez (born 16 March 1947) is a Mexican middle-distance runner. He competed in the men's 800 metres at the 1968 Summer Olympics.

References

1947 births
Living people
Athletes (track and field) at the 1967 Pan American Games
Athletes (track and field) at the 1968 Summer Olympics
Mexican male middle-distance runners
Olympic athletes of Mexico
Place of birth missing (living people)
Pan American Games competitors for Mexico